Anton Öhman (born December 2, 1995) is a Swedish ice hockey defenceman. He is currently playing with Skellefteå AIK of the Swedish Hockey League (SHL).

Öhman made his Swedish Hockey League debut playing with Skellefteå AIK during the 2013–14 SHL season.

References

External links

1995 births
Living people
Skellefteå AIK players
Swedish ice hockey defencemen
Sportspeople from Umeå